The Ordnance BL 12-pounder 7cwt was the British Army's field gun, which succeed the RML 13-pounder 8 cwt in 1885.

History 
The gun was initially adopted by both the Royal Field Artillery and Royal Horse Artillery, and was in full service by 1885. It marked a return to breech-loading guns, after the British Army had reverted to muzzle-loaders in the late 1860s following the failure of the Armstrong screw breech guns.

Problems arose when it was used by the Horse Artillery in the great Indian cavalry manoeuvres of 1891. The carriage was found to be too complicated and dust caused the metal surfaces of the axle traversing device to seize. It also proved too heavy to manoeuvre for horse artillery, which was intended to support cavalry in battle.

The 12-pounder 6 cwt gun was thus developed in 1892, when the new more powerful cordite replaced gunpowder, as a lighter alternative. It had a barrel 18 inches (460 mm) shorter, on a lighter and simpler carriage, and it entered service with the Royal Horse Artillery in 1894.

A 14-pound shell was adopted and the gun became a "15-pounder" from 1895. At that point the 12-pounder 7 cwt became redundant.

Combat use 
The gun was normally towed by 6 horses, in 3 pairs.

See also 
 Field artillery
 List of field guns

Surviving examples 
 Hobbs Artillery Park, Irwin Barracks, Karrakatta, Western Australia

Notes

References

Bibliography 
 Text Book of Gunnery, 1902. LONDON : PRINTED FOR HIS MAJESTY'S STATIONERY OFFICE, BY HARRISON AND SONS, ST. MARTIN'S LANE 
 Dale Clarke, British Artillery 1914–1919. Field Army Artillery. Osprey Publishing, Oxford UK, 2004
 Major Darrell D. Hall, "Field Artillery of the British Army 1860–1960. Part I, 1860 – 1900" in The South African Military History Society. Military History Journal – Vol 2 No 4, December 1972

External links 

 Handbook for the 12-PR. B.L. gun mark I, Land service, 1891 at State Library of Victoria
 Drill for the 12.5 – pr. B. L. gun on travelling field carriage. Melbourne. 1901 ? at State Library of Victoria
 Diagram of 12pr B.L.7cwt Field Gun Mark I from Victorian Forts and Artillery website
 Diagram of 12pr B.L.7cwt Field Gun Mark II from Victorian Forts and Artillery website

Artillery of the United Kingdom
76 mm artillery
Field guns